Henrietta Rose-Innes (born 14 September 1971) is a South African novelist and short-story writer. She was the 2008 winner of the Caine Prize for African Writing for her speculative-fiction story "Poison". Her novel Nineveh was shortlisted for the 2012 Sunday Times Prize for Fiction and the M-Net Literary Awards. In September of that year her story "Sanctuary" was awarded second place in the 2012 BBC (Inter)national Short Story Award.

Rose-Innes has been a Fellow in Literature at the Akademie Schloss Solitude, Stuttgart (2007–08) and has held residencies at the Rockefeller Foundation's Bellagio Center; Chateau de Lavigny, Lausanne; the kunst:raum sylt quelle, Sylt; Georgetown University; the University of Cape Town's Centre for Creative Writing; Caldera Arts Center, Oregon; and Hawthornden Castle Writer's Retreat, Scotland. She is a 2012 Gordon Fellow at the Gordon Institute for Creative and Performing Arts (GIPCA), University of Cape Town. She is a PhD in Creative Writing at the University of East Anglia.

Works

Novels
Green Lion (2015)
Nineveh (2011)
The Rock Alphabet (2004)
Shark's Egg (2000)

Nineveh has been translated into French and Spanish (both 2015), and Green Lion has appeared in French as L'Homme au Lion (2016). The Rock Alphabet has been published in Romanian (2007). Dream Homes: Schnappschüsse und Geschichten aus Kapstadt, collected essays and short stories, was published in German in 2008.

Short stories
Homing (2010) (collection)
Other short pieces have appeared in a variety of international publications, including The Best American Nonrequired Reading (2011), The Granta Book of the African Short Story (2011) and "Granta" online.

Compilations
Nice Times! A Book of South African Pleasures and Delights (Compiled and edited by Rose-Innes, 2006).

Awards
 Short story 'Sanctuary' awarded second place in the 2012 BBC (Inter)national Short Story Award.
 Nineveh shortlisted for the 2012 Sunday Times Prize for Fiction and the M-Net Literary Awards. 
 Winner of the 2008 Caine Prize for African Writing for "Poison"
 Winner of the 2007 Southern African PEN short-story award  
 Shortlisted, 2007 Caine Prize
 Shortlisted, 2001 M-Net Literary Award for Shark's Egg

See also
 List of South Africans
 List of South African writers

References

External links
 

1971 births
Living people
Alumni of the University of East Anglia
University of Cape Town alumni
University of the Witwatersrand alumni
Caine Prize winners
South African science fiction writers
South African fantasy writers
Women science fiction and fantasy writers
South African women novelists
South African women short story writers
South African short story writers